Otakar Sedloň (1885–1973) was a Czech realistic painter living in Prague.

Otakar Sedloň was born on 30 August 1885 in Trpín in eastern Bohemia, formerly part of Austria-Hungary. Otakar attended primary school in Doudleby nad Orlicí and followed on with a high school education in Kostelec nad Orlicí, where he graduated in 1904. Then he started studying on Academy of Art in Prague, where graduated in 1908.

In the mid-1920s, he traveled quite a bit, visiting places like the coast along the Adriatic Sea, Paris, Carpathian Ruthenia and Romania. This travel offered him great inspiration for his future activities as an artist. He eventually became a member of the association of artists called Myslbek and was a frequent participant in exhibitions arranged by this association. During this time, Otakar had his studio on the prestigious Narodni trida in Prague and was known as an excellent portrait painter. His paintings were displayed in the offices of ministries, banks and held by private collectors.

After World War II and the communist revolution in Czechoslovakia in 1948, he was barred from Myslbek because of his antagonism against communist rule and so-called “socialistic realism”.

Otakar Sedloň died on 18 October 1973 and was buried in the family tomb in Vamberk, together with his mother and father.

Gallery

External links
Otakar Sedloň's page at sedlon.us

1885 births
1973 deaths
People from Svitavy District
20th-century Czech painters
Czech male painters
20th-century Czech male artists